Hygrobia hermanni, commonly known as the screech beetle, is a species of beetle in the family Hygrobiidae. It is found in Southern and Western Europe and North Africa in stagnant and muddy waters. It able to make a strident grating noise, hence the name screech beetle. The sound is produced when the sharp edge of the 7th abdominal tergite is rubbed against a subapical median file on the elytral undersurface.

References

Adephaga
Beetles described in 1775
Taxa named by Johan Christian Fabricius